The American Association for Women in Radiology (or AAWR) is a professional association founded in 1981 as a resource for "professional socialization" for women in a male-dominated field of radiology.

AAWR’s role model is Marie Curie.

The main goals of the association were to provide a forum for issues unique to women in radiology, radiation oncology and related professions, to sponsor programs that promote opportunities for women, and to facilitate networking among women radiologists.

References

Medical associations based in the United States
Radiology organizations
Organizations established in 1981
Organizations for women in science and technology
Women's occupational organizations
Medical and health organizations based in Virginia